Citizen Cohn is a 1992 cable film covering the life of Joseph McCarthy's controversial chief counsel Roy Cohn. James Woods, who starred as Cohn, was nominated for both an Emmy and a Golden Globe for his performance. Citizen Cohn also stars Joe Don Baker (as McCarthy), Ed Flanders (as Cohn's courtroom nemesis Joseph Welch), Frederic Forrest (as writer Dashiell Hammett), and Pat Hingle (as Cohn's onetime mentor J. Edgar Hoover). It was directed by Frank Pierson. The movie was filmed on location in Pittsburgh, Pennsylvania.

Synopsis
The film spans Cohn's life from childhood through his initial rise to power as McCarthy's right-hand man in the Senate Permanent Subcommittee on Investigations hearings and his eventual public discrediting a month before his death in 1986 from AIDS. It is told mostly in flashback as Cohn lies dying at a hospital in Bethesda, Maryland, hallucinating that his many enemies (from Robert F. Kennedy to Ethel Rosenberg, a convicted Communist spy he sent to the electric chair) are haunting him. It concerns aspects of Cohn's life such as his closeted homosexuality and the measure of his culpability in the "Red Scare" of the 1950s. While the movie portrays Cohn in a decidedly unsympathetic light, it also depicts episodes in his life, such as the death of his beloved mother, in which he showed a more humane, compassionate side.

Cast

 James Woods as Roy Marcus Cohn
 Joe Don Baker as Sen. Joseph McCarthy
 Joseph Bologna as Walter Winchell
 Ed Flanders as Joseph N. Welch
 Jeffrey Nordling as G. David Schine
 Frederic Forrest as Dashiell Hammett
 Lee Grant as Dora Cohn
 Pat Hingle as J. Edgar Hoover
 John McMartin as 'Older Doctor'
 Karen Ludwig as Ethel Rosenberg
 Josef Sommer as Albert C. Cohn
 Daniel Benzali as Francis Joseph Cardinal Spellman
 Tovah Feldshuh as Iva Schlesinger
 John Finn as Sen. Charles Potter
 Fritz Weaver as Sen. Everett Dirksen
 Frances Foster as 'First Annie Lee Moss'
 Novella Nelson as 'Second Annie Lee Moss'
 Allen Garfield as Abe Feller
 David Marshall Grant as Robert F. Kennedy
 Daniel von Bargen as Clyde Tolson
 Lester Hoffman as Executioner #1

Score
Thomas Newman composed the largely minimalist film score.

See also
 Angels in America

References

External links
 
 McCarthyism and the Movies
 Welch-Cohn Confrontation, NY Times

American biographical films
HBO Films films
HIV/AIDS in American films
American LGBT-related television films
Films about McCarthyism
Films set in Pittsburgh
Peabody Award-winning broadcasts
Films directed by Frank Pierson
Films scored by Thomas Newman
1992 television films
1992 films
Cultural depictions of Robert F. Kennedy
Cultural depictions of Joseph McCarthy
Cultural depictions of Julius and Ethel Rosenberg
HIV/AIDS in television
Films about anti-LGBT sentiment
Cultural depictions of J. Edgar Hoover
1990s English-language films
1990s American films